Do Abi-ye Sofla (also Romanized as Do Ābī-ye Soflá; also known as Do Ābī-ye Pā’īn) is a village in Miankuh Rural District, Chapeshlu District, Dargaz County, Razavi Khorasan Province, Iran. At the 2006 census, its population was 157, in 32 families.

References 

Populated places in Dargaz County